The discography of At the Drive-In, an El Paso, Texas-based post-hardcore band active from 1994 to 2001, consists of four studio albums, one compilation album, five EPs, six singles, and three music videos.

At the Drive-In formed in 1994 with an initial lineup of Cedric Bixler-Zavala (lead vocals), Jim Ward (guitar and backing vocals), Jarrett Wrenn (guitar), Kenny Hopper (bass guitar), and Bernie Rincon (drums). This lineup released the band's debut EP, Hell Paso, through their own imprint Western Breed Records that November. Rincon was replaced by Davy Simmons for their second EP, 1995's ¡Alfaro Vive, Carajo! Further lineup changes saw Wrenn replaced by Adam Amparan, Hopper by Omar Rodríguez-López, and Simmons by Ryan Sawyer. The band's debut album, Acrobatic Tenement, was released in July 1996 through Flipside Records. The band's lineup fluctuated again, with Amparan's departure prompting Rodríguez-López to move to guitar while Paul Hinojos filled the bass position, and Tony Hajjar replaced Sawyer on drums. Ben Rodriguez played guitar on 1997's El Gran Orgo EP due to Ward's inability to participate, however Ward was back in place for a split single with The Aasee Lake and the band's second album, In/Casino/Out, released in August 1998 by Fearless Records. The lineup of Bixler-Zavala, Ward, Rodríguez-López, Hinojos, and Hajjar would remain intact until the band's dissolution.

1999 saw the release of the Vaya EP, which spawned the band's first music video, for the song "Metronome Arthritis". A trio of split releases followed in 2000, including an EP with Sunshine and singles with Burning Airlines and the Murder City Devils. Their third studio album, Relationship of Command, was released in September 2000 through Grand Royal Records. It proved to be a breakthrough, reaching #116 on the Billboard 200 and #33 on the UK Albums Chart. All three of its singles, "One Armed Scissor", "Rolodex Propaganda", and "Invalid Litter Dept.", reached the UK Singles Chart, with "One Armed Scissor" also reaching #26 on Billboard's Modern Rock Tracks chart. In 2001 the band went on indefinite hiatus, with Bixler-Zavala and Rodríguez-López forming The Mars Volta while Ward, Hinojos, and Hajjar formed Sparta. In November 2004 Fearless Records re-released all three of the band's studio albums as well as the Vaya EP, followed by the compilation album This Station Is Non-Operational in 2005 which reached #95 on the Billboard 200 and #3 amongst independently released albums.

Studio albums

Compilation albums

Extended plays

Singles

Compilation appearances

Music videos

References 

Discography
Discographies of American artists
Post-hardcore group discographies

cs:At the Drive-In
da:At the Drive-In
de:At the Drive-In
es:At The Drive-In
fr:At the Drive-In
gl:At the Drive-In
hr:At the Drive-In
it:At the Drive-In
nl:At the Drive-In
ja:アット・ザ・ドライヴイン
pl:At the Drive-In
pt:At the Drive-In
fi:At the Drive-In